Clasico Ciclistico Banfoandes is a road bicycle race held annually in Venezuela. The main sponsor of the event is Banfoandes. The 2008 edition was contested over 10 stages. From 1990 to 2004 it was reserved to amateurs; since 2005 it is rated 2.2 on the UCI America Tour.

Winners

References
  2008 Clasico Ciclistico Banfoandes

UCI America Tour races
Cycle races in Venezuela
Recurring sporting events established in 1990
1990 establishments in Venezuela